Vietnam Directorate of Fisheries is a government agency under directorate of fisheries policy in Vietnam Hanoi. And its subordinate operational unit "Vietnam Fisheries Resources Surveillance" was established on January 25, 2013 under Decree No. 102/2012/ND-CP of the Vietnamese Government. They will aim to better protect Vietnam's fisheries and sovereignty.

Vietnam Directorate of Fisheries is a law enforcement agency of Vietnam in directorate of fisheries and belongs to the Ministry of Agriculture and Rural Development. It performs functions: patrol, check, control, detect and handle violations of the law and bar investigation of fishery on the coast of Vietnam.

Members of the Vietnam Directorate of Fisheries will have authority to impose penalties on local and foreign fishing organisations and individuals operating within waters under the jurisdiction of Vietnam. They will be involved in disaster prevention and control as well as search and rescue activities.

Vietnam Directorate of Fisheries is responsible for taking part in the prevention of natural disasters and coordinating search and rescue and salvage; participate in protecting the sovereignty, sovereign rights and jurisdiction of the country in accordance with the waters law.

See also
^ Spiny lobster culture in Vietnam
 Vietnam Coast Guard

References

External links
 Ministry of Agriculture and Rural Development official site
 Vietnam Directorate of Fisheries

Vietnam